Brandon Sargeant (born 28 June 1997) is an English former professional snooker player.

Career
Sargeant earned his place on the main tour after finishing top of the Challenge Tour 2018/2019 ranking list, earning him a two-year card for the 2019–20 and 2020/2021 seasons. The leading two in the rankings earned cards and he was certain of his place in the top two even before the final event. Prior to the draw for the final event, he led the rankings and only David Grace and Mitchell Mann could catch him. Sargeant could only drop to third if both Grace and Mann reached the final. However, when Grace and Mann were drawn in the same half of the draw, Sargeant was guaranteed his place in the top two.

Performance and rankings timeline

Career finals

Amateur finals: 4 (2 titles)

References

External links
Brandon Sargeant at worldsnooker.com

1997 births
Living people
English snooker players
Sportspeople from Stoke-on-Trent